The Great Ocean Road Marathon is run over 44km from Lorne to Apollo Bay along the Victorian coastal route. It is the main race within the annual Great Ocean Road Running Festival, which also includes 60km, 23km and 6km runs, 5km and 10km walks and a 1.5km Kids Gallop. In 2019 a total of 8200 runners took part across the events. The event began in 2005, founded by Les Noseda with the assistance of The Apollo Bay Chamber of Commerce, Ross Stephens, Nick Polgeeft, Gerry Tidd and Joe Di Ceccio. It is now owned by IMG. The course record of 2:27:37 was set in 2019 by Australian runner Nick Earl. Earl broke the previous record of 2:27:42 set in 2011 by James Kipkelwon of Kenya, who also won the event in 2012.

Past winners
Key:

References

External links 
 Great Ocean Road Marathon Site

Recurring sporting events established in 2005
Marathons in Australia
Annual sporting events in Australia
2005 establishments in Australia